Harold M. Macomber (1914-June 12, 2002) was an American politician from Maine. Macomber, a Democratic, served as Mayor of South Portland in 1975 and 1978. He also served two terms (1981-1992) in the Maine House of Representatives. During part of his time in the Legislature, Macomber served as chair of the Transportation Committee.

References

1914 births
2002 deaths
Mayors of South Portland, Maine
Democratic Party members of the Maine House of Representatives
20th-century American politicians